Ernst Heeger (1783, Perchtoldsdorf1866, Laxenburg), was an Austrian amateur entomologist. He was a graduate of the Academy of Fine Arts in Vienna, a "Privatcadet" in the Napoleonic Wars, and from 1816 an employee of the Magistrat (administrative authority) of Vienna Later he founded a school of languages and drawing in Mödling. As an entomologist, he was particularly interested in the biology of  insects and in the benefits and damage caused by insects. He collaborated with Vincenz Kollar.He published a series of entomology works entitled Beiträge zur Naturgeschichte der Insecten and he was a pioneer of micrography publishing Album microscopisch-photographischer Darstellungen aus dem Gebiete der Zoologie between 1861 and 1863.

References
Zobodat
Wikisource de
 Gaedike, R.; Groll, E. K. & Taeger, A. 2012: Bibliography of the entomological literature from the beginning until 1863 : online database – version 1.0 – Senckenberg Deutsches Entomologisches Institut.

 1866 deaths
 1783 births
Austrian lepidopterists